Missouri Research and Education Network (MOREnet) is a member-driven consortium, operating as a separate business unit within the University of Missouri in Columbia, Missouri.  They are primarily made up of Missouri's K-12 schools, colleges and universities, public libraries and government organizations. In addition to maintaining a computer network for Internet access to school districts and libraries in the U.S. state of Missouri. they also provide technology consulting, a technology help desk as well as professional development and training, consortium discounts and a la carte services by a team of approximately 85 subject matter experts.

History 
In 1991, Missouri's four-year public colleges expressed the desire to connect to the NSFnet, a precursor to today's internet. Growth was rapid, by 2002, they connected 509 Missouri public school districts, 64 higher education institutions and 125 tax-supported libraries.

1991: Organization Formed for higher ed primarily to share research electronically

1993:A pilot project with Missouri Department of Elementary and Secondary Education to include 100 K-12 school districts to include internet connection (which at the time was still an interesting, but unproved concept) as well as hands-on training and technical consultation

1995: The Missouri Secretary of State secured $500,000 for shared online resources available to the entire MOREnet consortium

1997: The MOREnet backbone increased to 45 Mbit/s, which was 30 times faster than the 1993 service

1999: The MOREnet backbone increased to 155 Mbit/s, enabling full-scale interactive video services

2003: The MOREnet backbone increased to 622 Mbit/s

2009: The MOREnet backbone was migrated to a fiber-optic infrastructure to support 10 Gbit/s (10,000 Mbit/s) capacity

2013: Awarded nearly $1 million in grant funding to 3 members for projects designed over a 3-year period to improve outcomes through the adoption of new technologies and STEM based activities, visual learning, business continuity and disaster recovery.

2013: Began a backbone fiber expansion project to bring much needed infrastructure to the un- and under-served region of southeast Missouri

2014: Upgraded network to support up to 100 Gbit/s, making MOREnet one of the first research and education networks in the country to support that speed

Work Environment 
In 2016, MOREnet was recognized for exemplary workplace practices from When Work Works, a national initiative, led by the partnership for the Families and Work Institute and the Society for Human Resource Management.

MOREnet practices a modified version of ROWE (Results-Only Work Envioronment).  A management strategy used at MOREnet, where employees are evaluated on performance, not presence. In a ROWE, leadership focuses only on results – increasing the organization's performance while cultivating the right environment for people to manage all the demands in their lives...including work.

References

External links
Official website

University of Missouri
Educational technology companies of the United States
Non-profit organizations based in Missouri
Non-profit organizations based in Columbia, Missouri